William C. Pack is an American novelist. A former senior executive, Pack was born and raised in rural Montana, he left home at an early age and worked a variety of jobs before earning his GED and at age 21, joined a major Wall Street firm. He rose to become the youngest Executive VP/Divisional Director of a large investment firm while simultaneously acting as CEO of a private food manufacturing company affiliated with Beatrice Foods and served a prestigious 3-year appointment with the NASD (now FINRA) in creating and enforcing rules and regulations on Wall Street.

At 43, Pack left Wall Street to pursue lifelong goals. He took the SATs and earned a slot at Stanford University as the oldest undergraduate on campus. In 3 years he graduated Phi Beta Kappa with distinction and high honors. His thesis received the Annual Reviews Prize in Anthropological Sciences and Pack became the chief archaeologist of Stanford's Greater Yellowstone Archaeological Site Survey. Pack's greatest dream was to be a novelist - He was a Lucas Artists Fellowship Writer in Residence and in 2007, his first short story was published.

His novel The Bottom of the Sky was named a winning finalist in the National Best Book 2009 Awards in the category of Fiction and Literature: General (USA Book News). He has written his first children's book, "Never Kiss a Chicken!" which was published May, 2021.3 and was a finalist in the Children's Picture Book: Hardcover Fiction category of the 2021 Best Book Awards.4

Since The Bottom of the Sky'''s introduction, Pack has been featured on NPR affiliates, the PBS-syndicated show Between the Lines, on Face the State and by Forbes''.

References

3. https://www.mercurynews.com/2021/05/26/good-news-from-san-jose-city-halls-falcon-nest/

4. http://americanbookfest.com/2021bbafullresults.html

General references
Montana Public Radio
Voice of America 

Living people
Year of birth missing (living people)
21st-century American novelists
American male novelists
21st-century American male writers